Dusti is a town in Khatlon Region, southern Tajikistan, near the Afghan border. It is the seat of the Jayhun District. Its population is 18,800 (January 2020 estimate). Under Soviet rule the town was named Molotovabad.

Transport 
Dusti is located on north–south highway E123. It is served by a station on the national railway system.

See also 
 Railway stations in Tajikistan

References 

Populated places in Khatlon Region